Biathlon at the 1980 Winter Olympics consisted of three biathlon events. They were held at the Lake Placid Olympic Sports Complex Cross Country Biathlon Center.  This Olympic featured the debut of the 10 kilometre sprint event. The events began on 16 February and ended on 22 February 1980.

Medal summary

Three nations won medals in biathlon, the Soviet Union leading the medal table with four medals (2 gold, 1 silver, 1 bronze). Anatoly Alyabyev led the individual medal table, with two gold medals and a bronze; Frank Ullrich also won three medals, one gold and two silvers.

Medal table

Events

Participating nations
Eighteen nations sent biathletes to compete in the events. Below is a list of the competing nations; in parentheses are the number of national competitors. Argentina, China and Yugoslavia made their Olympic biathlon debuts.

References

 
1980
1980 Winter Olympics events
1980 in biathlon
Biathlon competitions in the United States